Pavlo Valeriyovych Rozenko (born July 15, 1970 in Kyiv, Ukraine) is a Ukrainian politician and a former Vice Prime Minister of Ukraine and a former Minister of Labor and Social Policy.

Biography
Rozenko was a member of the Ukrainian Student Society and the People's Movement of Ukraine since 1989. He participated in the 1990 Student Revolution (also known as the Revolution on Granite) in Kyiv that led to dismissal of the First Masol Government.

From 2008 until 2010, Rozenko was First Deputy Minister of Labor and Social Policy of Ukraine in the Second Tymoshenko Government under his current predecessor, Lyudmyla Denisova, as minister. From March 2010 till September 2011 he worked as an expert on social, economic and budgetary policies at Razumkov Center. Rozenko was elected to Ukrainian Parliament in 2012 from the UDAR party, and re-elected in 2014. In 2014 he was elected after placing 26th on the electoral list of Petro Poroshenko Bloc.

Pavlo Rozenko is a grandson of the former Ukrainian statesman a deputy Chairman of the Council of Ministers of the Ukrainian SSR and the Chairman of DerzhPlan, Petro Rozenko.

References

 	 

1970 births
Living people
Politicians from Kyiv
Kyiv Polytechnic Institute alumni
People's Movement of Ukraine politicians
Ukrainian Democratic Alliance for Reform politicians
Petro Poroshenko Bloc politicians
Seventh convocation members of the Verkhovna Rada
Eighth convocation members of the Verkhovna Rada
Social policy ministers of Ukraine
Vice Prime Ministers of Ukraine
People of the Revolution on Granite